Bactrocythara ascara is an extinct species of sea snail, a marine gastropod mollusk in the family Mangeliidae.

Description

Distribution
This extinct species was found in Miocene strata of the Bowden Formation, Jamaica; age range: 7.246 to 2.588 Ma

References

 W. P. Woodring. 1928. Miocene Molluscs from Bowden, Jamaica. Part 2: Gastropods and discussion of results . Contributions to the Geology and Palaeontology of the West Indies
 A. J. W. Hendy, D. P. Buick, K. V. Bulinski, C. A. Ferguson, and A. I. Miller. 2008. Unpublished census data from Atlantic coastal plain and circum-Caribbean Neogene assemblages and taxonomic opinions.

ascara